The Girls is the second novel by Canadian novelist and screenwriter Lori Lansens. It was first published in 2005 by Knopf Canada.

It is the life story of a pair of conjoined twins, Rose and Ruby Darlen, and is narrated by the twins themselves. Rose, a budding writer, also details key moments from the lives of their adoptive parents, Aunt Lovey and Uncle Stash.

The girls are joined at the head (craniopagus), with Rose carrying her physically weaker and smaller sister on her right hip. According to the description of the condition at the start of the book, the girls are estimated to share 100 veins as well as skull bones. However, while their cerebral tissues are meshed, they have distinctly separate brains and so have different personalities.

The book is set in the fictional small town of Leaford in Ontario, Canada, with the girls frequently travelling to nearby cities of Chatham, Windsor, and London. The girls also accompany their Uncle Stash to his native Slovakia.

2005 Canadian novels
Knopf Canada books
Fictional conjoined twins
Novels set in Ontario

References